James Isaac Van Alen (December 31, 1772 – May 18, 1822) was an American politician who was a representative from New York and an elder half brother of U.S. President Martin Van Buren.

Early life

Van Alen was born in Kinderhook, New York on December 31, 1772, the son of Johannes Van Alen and Marytje Goes (or Hoes) Van Alen.  On January 1, 1773, he was christened Jacobus Van Alen at Kinderhook's Dutch Reformed Church. He had two siblings, Marytje (or Maria) Van Alen and John Isaac Van Alen.
After the death of his father, his mother married Abraham Van Buren in 1776. His mother had five more children with Van Buren, including  Dirckie "Derike" Van Buren, Jannetje (called "Hannah" or "Jane") Van Buren, future U.S. President Martin Van Buren, Lawrence Van Buren, and Abraham Van Buren Jr.

Van Alen attended the common schools, studied law, and was admitted to the bar in 1794.

Career
After being admitted to the bar in New York, he practiced in Kinderhook, later practicing in partnership with Martin Van Buren.  From 1797 to 1801 he was Kinderhook's Town Clerk.

He was a member of the State constitutional convention of 1801, and was a justice of the peace from 1801 to 1804.  He was a member of the New York State Assembly in 1804.  Van Alen was surrogate judge of Columbia County from 1804 to 1808.

U.S. Congress
Van Alen was elected  to the 10th Congress as a Democratic-Republican, succeeding Henry W. Livingston and holding office from March 4, 1807, to March 3, 1809.  He was an unsuccessful candidate for reelection in 1808 and John Thompson replaced him in the House.

Later career

He later returned to the surrogate judge's position, serving from 1815 until his death.  He was succeeded by his half-brother, Abraham A. Van Buren.

Personal life
Van Alen never married or had children. He died in Kinderhook on May 18, 1822, and was buried at Kinderhook Cemetery.

References

External links 

1772 births
1822 deaths
American people of Dutch descent
Burials in New York (state)
Democratic-Republican Party members of the United States House of Representatives from New York (state)
Members of the New York State Assembly
New York (state) lawyers
New York (state) state court judges
People from Kinderhook, New York
James I.
James I.